Arizona Bound is a lost 1927 American silent Western film directed by John Waters and starring Gary Cooper, Betty Jewel, and El Brendel.

Written by Richard Allen Gates, Alfred Hustwick, Marion Jackson, and John Stone, the film is about an Arizona cowboy who spends most of his time caring for his white horse and pursuing a local girl, who is unimpressed with his irresponsible ways.

After he takes a job as a stagecoach guard to protect a shipment of gold, he is attacked by a Texas gang. After being accused of being one of the bandits, he narrowly escapes lynching, retrieves the gold, and establishes his innocence and wins the trust of the local girl. Arizona Bound was filmed on location in Bryce Canyon National Park in Utah.

Produced by E. Lloyd Sheldon for Famous Players-Lasky Corporation, the film was released on April 9, 1927, in the United States.

Plot
In the small mining town of Mesquite, cowboy Dave Saulter (Gary Cooper) spends most of his time looking after his white wonder horse Flash and romantically pursuing a local girl named Ann Winslow (Betty Jewel). Unimpressed with Dave's irresponsible ways, she attends a dance with another cowboy, Buck Hanna (Jack Dougherty). At the dance, Dave is able to ensnare Buck just as he is about to take the first dance with Ann. Later, an embittered Buck plans to steal the gold shipment entrusted to his protection. Meanwhile, Dave ties up the man tasked with protecting the shipment and goes in his place.

As the coach makes its way along a desert road, a bandit named Texas Jack (Christian J. Frank) and his gang waylay the shipment and knock Dave unconscious. After Buck and his men accuse Dave of being involved in the heist, the Swede Oley Smoke Oleson (El Brendel) accidentally locates the stolen gold. When Ann discovers that Buck is guilty of the heist, she confronts him, and he kidnaps her in a coach, with Dave in hot pursuit. When he catches up to the fleeing bandit, he overpowers Buck and wins the heart of Ann.

Cast
 Gary Cooper as Dave Saulter
 Betty Jewel as Ann Winslow
 El Brendel as Oley Smoke Oleson
 Jack Dougherty as Buck Hanna
 Christian J. Frank as Texas Jack
 Charles Crockett as John Winslow
 Joe Butterworth as Tommy Winslow
 Guy Oliver as Sheriff
 Guinn "Big Boy" Williams as Bit part

Production
Arizona Bound was filmed on location in Bryce Canyon National Park in Utah also The Apache Trail and Papago Park in Arizona.

References

External links
 
 
 

1927 Western (genre) films
1927 films
American black-and-white films
Films shot in Utah
Lost Western (genre) films
Lost American films
1927 lost films
Silent American Western (genre) films
1920s American films
1920s English-language films